William Anthony Stewart (19 May 1847 – 31 July 1883) was an English first-class cricketer and clergyman.

The son of The Reverend Edward Stewart, he was born in May 1847 at Sparsholt, Hampshire. He was educated at Winchester College, before matriculating to Oriel College, Oxford. While studying at Oxford, he played first-class cricket for Oxford University Cricket Club in 1869 and 1870, making seven appearances. In the 1870 University Match, he was the second-to-last batsman to be dismissed in Frank Cobden's famous hat-trick, taken with Oxford requiring just 4 runs to win the match. Playing as a wicket-keeper for Oxford, he took 12 catches and made 8 stumpings. As a batsman, he scored 36 runs with a highest score of 12. He also played first-class cricket for Hampshire against the Marylebone Cricket Club (MCC) at Southampton in 1869. After graduating from Oxford in 1870, Stewart was ordained in the Church of England as a deacon. He was curate at Blagdon in Somerset from 1870 to 1873, after which he was appointed to Ireland as perpetual curate of Muckross in County Kerry. He returned to England in 1880 to take up the post of vicar at West Tisted, Hampshire. He later played a second first-class cricket for Hampshire against the MCC at Lord's in 1878. Stewart died in July 1883 at Twyford, Hampshire. His brother, Henry, was also a first-class cricketer. His brother-in-law was the Hampshire cricketer Charles Everett.

References

External links

1847 births
1883 deaths
People from the City of Winchester
People educated at Winchester College
Alumni of Oriel College, Oxford
English cricketers
Oxford University cricketers
Hampshire cricketers
Wicket-keepers
19th-century English Anglican priests